Quer o Destino is a Portuguese telenovela broadcast and produced by TVI. It is written by and adapted from the Chilean telenovela Amanda. The telenovela premiered on March 23, 2020 and ended on October 26, 2020.

Plot 
«Quer o Destino» is a very Portuguese soap opera and possibly familiar to many who know the secrets that were buried in the estates of wealthy families in ancient Portugal.

Margarida Rosa (Sara Barradas), in her teens, after being raped and watching her own father's murder, the innocent young woman ran away from the fear of being, herself, killed in the silence of Ribatejo.

Now, transformed into a woman in arms, with the name of Vitória Santareno, she decides to leave the capital and return to her origins. The goal? Take revenge on the family of your rapists.

Along the way, there is love and lack of love, there are lessons to overcome and many mirrors of the intrinsic human evil. Vitória will do many objectionable things but, despite having chosen a winding route, she proves to be able to overcome traumas, fears and enemies in the flesh.

Cast

Main 
 Sara Barradas as Margarida Rosa / Vitória Santareno
 Pedro Sousa as Mateus Costa de Santa Cruz
 Pedro Teixeira as Marcos Costa de Santa Cruz
 Filipe Vargas as Lucas Costa de Santa Cruz
 Isaac Alfaiate as João Costa de Santa Cruz

Secondary 
 Ana Sofia Martins as Carla Isabel Silva
 João Vicente as Carlos Paulo Branco Reis
 Maya Booth as Rita Paiva do Amaral
 Mafalda Marafusta as Maria Isabel Romão
 Inês Herédia as Isabela Fonseca dos Santos
 Leonor Seixas as Patrícia Fontes
 Marta Faial as Sandra Isabel Silva
 Rodrigo Paganelli as Hugo Paulo Branco Reis
 Madalena Aragão as Ana Catarina Santa Cruz
 Diogo Lopes
 Luís Henrique as Diogo Santa Cruz
 Maria Marques as Pilar Santa Cruz

Guest stars 
 Ana Bustorff as Elvira de Jesus Fonseca dos Santos
 Luís Esparteiro as Alfredo Paulo Reis
 Marina Mota as Joana Branco Reis
 Maria José Paschoal as Catarina Costa de Santa Cruz

Awards and nominations

References

External links 

 

Portuguese telenovelas
Televisão Independente telenovelas
2020 Portuguese television series debuts
2020 Portuguese television series endings
2020 telenovelas
Portuguese-language telenovelas
2020s Portuguese television series